Thryv is a publicly traded software as a service (SaaS) company. It is headquartered in Dallas, Texas, and operates in 48 states across the United States of America with more than 2,400 employees. The company began as a conglomerate of Yellow Pages companies. In June 2020, Thryv reported $1.3 billion in revenue over a twelve-month period.

History
The company was created through a 2017 merger of Dex Media, a yellow pages publisher that restructured its debt in 2016, and YP Holdings, a yellow-pages publisher. It published over 1,700 directories, both yellow and white pages, as well as search tools for businesses.

With the increasing transition to digital, mobile and online search, Thryv provides local businesses marketing products to drive customers to client sites. 

The company rebranded on July 15, 2019, with a focus on its flagship software product. It reported $1.4 billion in revenue that year with a profit of $35.5 million. In October 2020, Thryv Holdings, Inc. went public through a direct listing on NASDAQ with a reported 40,000 SaaS clients.

In February 2021, the company announced a partnership with Lendio for Thryv subscribers to access Paycheck Protection Program loans and small business financing.

References

Companies based in Dallas
Telephone directory publishing companies of the United States
Companies listed on the Nasdaq
Search engine software
Software companies of the United States
Direct stock offerings